Northwest High School is a public high school located in Cedar Hill, Missouri that is part of the Northwest R-1 School District.

Activities
For the 2011–2012 school year, the school offered 20 activities approved by the Missouri State High School Activities Association (MSHSAA): baseball, boys and girls basketball, sideline cheerleading, boys and girls cross country, dance team, 11-man football, boys and girls golf, music activities, boys and girls soccer, softball, boys and girls track and field, boys and girls volleyball, winter guard, and wrestling. In addition to its current activities, Northwest students have won two state championships, including:
Softball: 1986
Wrestling: 1984
Northwest also has two individual boys cross country champions and four individual wrestling champions.

Alumni
Brian Boehringer: Major League Baseball player
David Frisch: National Football League player
Michael Chandler: professional mixed martial artist fighter, former Lightweight Champion of Bellator MMA

References

High schools in Jefferson County, Missouri
Educational institutions established in 1955
Public high schools in Missouri
1955 establishments in Missouri